Dog Eat Dog was an American game show, which originally ran from June 17, 2002 to August 26, 2003. It was based on the UK version of the show by the same name. It was hosted by Brooke Burns, and had contestants compete against each other in physical competitions, trivia, and other assorted games for a prize of $25,000.

Gameplay

Main game
Six players spend a day together at a training camp before arriving at the studio for the show. A challenge is described, and the players each vote for the one they want to send into it. The player receiving the most votes takes the challenge. Failure to complete it sends the player to the "Dog Pound" and eliminates him/her from play, while completing it allows the player to send one of the people who voted for him/her to the "Dog Pound."

Four challenges are played in this manner. If a tie vote occurs on the first one, a player is chosen at random to break it, on all subsequent challenges, the last player eliminated acts as the tiebreaker. The last two players compete in a fifth, head-to-head challenge, such as Fish Throwing and Wall Climbing, with the winner being officially declared that night's "Top Dog" and the loser going to the "Dog Pound.” The "Top Dog" then faces the other five players in a trivia challenge in which $25,000 is awarded to the winning side.

Final round
The previously determined "Top Dog" faces the five members of the "Dog Pound." A category is shown, like Music, Food and Drink, Movies, Business, Sports, Famous People, Politics, History, Animals, Fashion, Television, Celebrities, Education, Medicine, Video Games/Games, Geography, Transportation, Theater, and more, and the Top Dog chooses a member of the Dog Pound who they think cannot answer a question in that category. Each contestant can be chosen only once. If the Dog Pound member answers correctly, the Dog Pound scores a point, if not, the Top Dog scores a point. The first side to score three points wins the game and $25,000 (the five Dog Pound members receiving a divided $5,000 each if they win).

Stunts 
Some of the one-player stunts featured on various versions of the show were:

Some of the head-to-head competitions included:

Controversy
In the show's first episode, a contestant named Darin Goka had to be hospitalized after falling unconscious during a challenge where he had to hold his breath underwater. The contestant sued NBC, claiming that the mechanism failed and caused him brain damage.  This also resulted in only four members participating in the final challenge; these four failed to win the money.

References

External links
  at the Wayback Machine
 

2002 American television series debuts
2003 American television series endings
2000s American game shows
American television series based on British television series
English-language television shows
NBC original programming
Television series by Universal Television
Television shows filmed in California